A piragua  is a Puerto Rican shaved ice dessert, shaped like a cone, consisting of shaved ice and covered with fruit-flavored syrup. Besides Puerto Rico, piraguas can be found in mainland areas of the United States with large Puerto Rican communities, such as New York and Central Florida.

Definition
In Puerto Rico, the word  refers to a frozen treat made of shaved ice and covered with fruit-flavored syrup. Unlike the American snow cone which is round and resembles a snowball, the piragua is pointy and shaped like a pyramid. In Latin America, frozen treats similar to the piragua are known by many different names.

Preparation and sale

Piragüeros

Most piragüeros sell their product from a colorful wooden pushcart that carries an umbrella, instead of from a fixed stand or kiosk.

The piragüero makes the treats from the shavings off a block of solid ice inside his cart and mixtures of fruit-flavored syrups. The tropical syrup flavors vary from lemon and strawberry to passion fruit and guava. Once the syrups are ready, the piragüero will go to his place of business, which in Puerto Rico is usually close to the town plaza, while in the United States it is usually close to the public parks near Hispanic neighborhoods, to sell his product.

In the process of preparing a piragua, the piragüero shaves the ice from the block of ice with a hand ice shaver. He then puts the shaved ice into a cup and uses a funnel-shaped tool to give it the distinctive pyramid shape. The piragüero finishes making the piragua when he pours the desired flavored syrup over it. Piragüeros only go out on hot sunny days because those are the only days when they can expect good business.

Unlike the typical American snow cone, which is often eaten with a spoon, the piragua is eaten straight out of the cup or sipped through a straw.

Flavored syrups
 
Flavored syrups commonly used in piraguas include the following:

  (sesame seed)
  (anise)
  (cherry)
  (orange)
  (coconut)
  (cream)
  (red raspberry)
  (strawberry)
  (soursop)
  (guava)
  (lemon)
  (mango)
  (mandarin orange)
  (mauby)
  (sugar cane syrup)
  (honeydew)
  (passion fruit)
  (pineapple)
  (tamarind)
  (grape)
  (vanilla)

Two of the terms used for fruit flavors in Puerto Rico are not common in other Spanish-speaking places. , an Anglicism derived from the English word watermelon, is called  in standard Spanish.

On the United States mainland

In the 1940s, during the Puerto Rican Great Migration in which large numbers of Puerto Ricans moved to New York, they took with them their customs and traditions, including the piraguas.

According to Holding Aloft the Banner of Ethiopia by Winston James, piraguas were introduced in New York by Puerto Ricans as early as 1926. In his book, James describes the presence of piragua pushcarts during the Harlem Riots against the Puerto Rican migrants in July 1926. Author Miguel Meléndez, who moved from New York City to Chicago in the late 1950s, expresses in his book We Took the Streets: Fighting for Latino Rights the following: 

The piragua was mentioned by the U.S. Environmental Protection Agency (EPA) in a blog post titled "What's in Your Piragua?" EPA Deputy Administrator Marcus Peacock noted that the EPA had helped the Puerto Rican government negotiate over $1 billion in new water treatment improvements, and added, "As this commitment is fulfilled, the water will just get cleaner and cleaner whether it is coming out of a tap or is served in a piragua (no, not a canoe, but a Puerto Rican snow cone) – regardless of the weather."

Piragua vending is not limited to Puerto Rico and New York. Piragüeros with their piragua pushcarts can be found in Hispanic neighborhoods in Bridgeport, Chicago, Jersey City, Miami, Newark, Philadelphia, and elsewhere.

Cultural influence
The Puerto Rican piragua has been the subject of paintings and sculpture, a children's book, and songs in a Broadway musical:

 The painting  ("Piragua Pushcart") is a mixed media piece by an unknown artist, on exhibit at El Museo del Barrio in New York.
 The town of Coamo, Puerto Rico, commissioned the creation of a monument in the honor of the piragüeros. The statue, which is called , is located in the town plaza.
 An educational storybook called Luisito and the Piragua, written in 1979 for children of migrant workers in Connecticut, tells the story of a Puerto Rican boy who moved to the United States and misses his friends and his afternoon treat of a piragua. While on an errand for his mother, Luisito sees a piragüero making piraguas, and is happy to find that he can buy piraguas once more.
 The 2008 Broadway production of Lin-Manuel Miranda's musical In the Heights included a song called "Piragua" and its reprise, in which a local piragüero (known in the play as Piragua Guy) sings about his life and trade in New York's Washington Heights. This character became the basis for a web-based reality-show parody, Legally Brown: The Search for the Next Piragua Guy, directed by Miranda, which featured well-known Broadway actors competing to take over the role. In the 2021 film adaptation of In the Heights, Miranda himself was cast in the supporting role of the Piragüero.

Gallery

See also

Other regional versions:
 Ais kacang – Southeast Asian
 Grattachecca and Italian ice – Italian
 Halo halo – Filipino
 Kakigori – Japanese
 Patbingsu – Korean
 Shave ice – Hawaiian
 Sno-ball – New Orleanian
 Snow cone – American shaved ice

References

External links
 Piragua recipe
 

Ice-based desserts
Puerto Rican culture
Puerto Rican cuisine